Hamrahi is a 1974 Bollywood drama film directed by Anand Sagar and produced by Subhash Sagar.

Cast
Randhir Kapoor as Ramesh  
Tanuja as Shalini 'Shalu'  
Gajanan Jagirdar 
K. N. Singh 
Sujit Kumar   
Lalita Pawar   
Keshto Mukherjee
Gurcharan Pohli
Rajendra Nath
Pinchoo Kapoor
Tun Tun
Shakeela Bano Bhopali as Qawaal Singer
Hiralal

Music

References

External links
 

1974 films
1970s Hindi-language films
1974 drama films
Films scored by Kalyanji Anandji